Comfort is a census-designated place (CDP) in Boone County, West Virginia, United States. Comfort has a post office with ZIP code 25049. As of the 2010 census, its population is 306. Comfort is the home of Sherman Elementary School.

References

Census-designated places in Boone County, West Virginia
Census-designated places in West Virginia